Mount Koons is a small mountain situated  east of Miller Butte in the Outback Nunataks, Antarctica. It was mapped by the United States Geological Survey from surveys and U.S. Navy air photos, 1959–64, and was named by the Advisory Committee on Antarctic Names for Robert W. Koons, a United States Antarctic Research Program logistics coordinator with the McMurdo Station winter party, 1968.

References

Mountains of Victoria Land
Pennell Coast